ONE: Heavy Hitters (also known as ONE 150: Xiong vs. Miura) was a Combat sport event produced by ONE Championship that took place on January 14, 2022, at the Singapore Indoor Stadium in Kallang, Singapore.

Background
The event will be headlined by a Women's Strawweight championship bout between reigning Champion Xiong Jingnan and challenger Ayaka Miura.

The co main event was set to feature a kickboxing title fight, the reigning ONE Kickboxing Light Heavyweight Champion Roman Kryklia was set to defend his title against Murat Aygün. The two were originally scheduled to fight at ONE Championship: Big Bang last year. However, in turn, Aygün has to withdraw on January 12 due to COVID-19, the bout was cancelled for the second time.However, the bout was canceled and moved to ONE: Full Circle.

Filipino fighter Jeremy Miado and Robin Catalan will not be taking part in  the upcoming event due to COVID-19. 
The pinoys opponents will thus face each other instead. Catalan, will return to action after a year against Elipitua Siregar on the card.

Results

Bonus awards
The following fighters received $50,000 bonuses.
Performance of the Night: Senzo Ikeda, Ekaterina Vandaryeva and Saygid Izagakhmaev

See also 

 2022 in ONE Championship
 List of ONE Championship events
 List of current ONE fighters

References 

Events in Singapore
ONE Championship events
2022 in mixed martial arts
Mixed martial arts in Singapore
Sports competitions in Singapore
January 2022 sports events in Singapore